The Berks and Hants Railway comprised two railway lines built simultaneously by the Great Western Railway (GWR) south and west from  in an attempt to keep the London and South Western Railway (LSWR) out of the area that it considered to be its territory in England.

Since 1906 part of this route has formed the direct Reading to Taunton Line used by trains to Devon and Cornwall. The term 'Berks and Hants Line' has been used intermittently by officials and passengers for the whole route from Reading to Taunton even though it does not enter Hampshire and most was never built by the Berks and Hants Railway.

Later the GWR station was closed and trains on the Reading to Basingstoke Line now use a platform of the rebuilt LSWR station.

History
However, the following year saw an Act of Parliament passed to allow the construction of the GWR-backed Berks and Hants Railway from Reading to both Basingstoke and Hungerford. The capital for this company was put forward in the names of GWR directors, and the following year a new Act of Parliament saw the Berks and Hants formally absorbed into the larger company.

The first section to open was that to Hungerford on 21 December 1847.  The line to Basingstoke left the Hungerford line at Southcote Junction on the outskirts of Reading, and was opened nearly a year later on 1 November 1848.

The Berks and Hants Extension Railway was opened from Hungerford to Devizes on 11 November 1862.  This was part of a GWR scheme to provide a more direct line from London to Exeter in Devon, however other elements of the route failed to materialise and the direct route to Exeter was built by the LSWR from Basingstoke through .

A third rail was laid along the Basingstoke branch on 22 December 1856.  This mixed gauge was to allow standard gauge goods trains to run through from the Midlands to ports on the South coast.  Broad gauge trains stopped running on this route from 1 April 1869.

On 27 June 1874, a special road coach service was instigated between Hungerford and Devizes while the engineers converted the single track on this section to standard gauge.  The remainder of the line from Hungerford to Southcote Junction at Reading was worked as a single line with trains in both directions using the normal eastbound line with a passing place kept at Newbury while the westbound line was converted.  The last broad gauge train ran on 30 June and the following day the trains started to use the new standard gauge westbound line and ran through to Devizes again.  Conversion of the eastbound line could then take place, and a normal service resumed on 4 July.

From 2 July 1906 through passenger trains on the Reading to Taunton line started running over the Berks and Hants line following the completion of a new cut-off line from Castle Cary railway station to Cogload Junction near Taunton.

Relics
Most of the original Berks and Hants stations have been rebuilt; however, there are two early survivors. 
Mortimer railway station on the Basingstoke line is a good example of Isambard Kingdom Brunel's "chalet" style station; the main building has eaves on all sides to give shelter to passengers and there is a small waiting shelter on the opposite platform in matching style.  
Pewsey railway station on the Extension has a main building that shows the decorative brickwork that was a feature of the line's stations; the waiting room on the opposite platform is a modern reproduction. Original station name boards from Manningford Halt and Wootton Rivers Halt are at Pewsey Heritage Centre alongside other railway exhibits.

References

Great Western Railway constituents
7 ft gauge railways
Rail transport in Berkshire
Rail transport in Hampshire
Railway lines opened in 1862
1862 establishments in England